Hablützel is a surname. Notable people with the surname include: 

David Hablützel (born 1996), Swiss snowboarder
Gianna Hablützel-Bürki (born 1969), Swiss fencer
Stefan Hablützel (born 1958), Swiss rower